Sara Runesten Petersen (born 8 May 1975) is a Denmark-born female badminton player from New Zealand.

Career
Petersen competed in badminton at the 2004 Summer Olympics in the mixed doubles with partner Daniel Shirley.  They defeated Philippe Bourret and Denyse Julien of Canada in the first round but lost to Jonas Rasmussen and Rikke Olsen of Denmark in the round of 16.

They also won a bronze medal at the 2005 IBF World Championships in the mixed doubles.

References

Danish female badminton players
New Zealand female badminton players
Olympic badminton players of New Zealand
Badminton players at the 2004 Summer Olympics
Commonwealth Games silver medallists for New Zealand
Commonwealth Games bronze medallists for New Zealand
Badminton players at the 2002 Commonwealth Games
Badminton players at the 2006 Commonwealth Games
1975 births
Living people
Commonwealth Games medallists in badminton
Medallists at the 2002 Commonwealth Games
Medallists at the 2006 Commonwealth Games